Eagle Island Camp, also known as Camp Eagle Island or simply EIC, is a youth summer camp and former Girl Scout camp located on Eagle Island on Upper Saranac Lake in New York's Adirondack region.  The site is listed on the National Register of Historic Places.

Adirondack Great Camp years 
The camp occupies buildings originally built in 1903 as a summer retreat for New York Governor and United States Vice President Levi Morton and designed by architect William L. Coulter. The mainland camp now known as Pine Brook was originally a part of the Morton Great Camp. Camp Eagle Island was included in a multiple property submission for listing on the National Register of Historic Places in 1986, was listed there in 1987, and was named a National Historic Landmark in 2004.

Girl Scout years 
Eagle Island Camp became a Girl Scout property in 1938, when the Graves family of Orange, New Jersey, gave the island to the Maplewood-South Orange Girl Scout Council. After a series of council mergers, the last council to own the property and operate the camp was Girl Scouts Heart of New Jersey. The Council operated it as overnight camp through the summer of 2008 and voted to sell it on October 11, 2010.

Later years 
The camp property, including Eagle Island, two smaller islands, and a staging area on Gilpin Bay Road on the mainland, was purchased on November 6, 2015 by The Friends of Eagle Island, Inc. (now Eagle Island, Inc.), which operates the property as a youth camp.

References

External links
 
 Eagle Island Camp, National Historic Landmark summary, at National Park Service

Eagle Island
National Historic Landmarks in New York (state)
1899 establishments in New York (state)
Buildings and structures in Franklin County, New York
Tourist attractions in Franklin County, New York
Eagle Island
National Register of Historic Places in Franklin County, New York
Residential buildings on the National Register of Historic Places in New York (state)